Taipei City Council is the city council of Taipei, Taiwan. One of the largest local councils in Taiwan, the city council is currently composed of 61 councillors, all elected lately in the 2022 Taiwanese local elections.

Composition 

The Kuomintang, gaining 2 seat after the 2022 Taiwanese local elections, maintained its status as the largest party in the city council, but falling short of an overall majority. The Democratic Progressive Party, although still being the largest opposition party in the council, gain 2 seats in the election. New Party and People First Party, members of the conventional pan-Blue coalition, won 2 seats each. Smaller parties, including New Power Party, Social Democratic Party and Can't Stop This Party, won 3 seats in total. All standing as an independent, 7 candidates were elected to the city council.

Since the local elections in 2022, the Council was composed as follows:

History

First building

The Council was formed in 1946 after the handover of Taiwan to the Republic of China from the Japanese Government. The Council Chamber was initially located in the Zhongshan Hall in Zhongzheng District.

Second building

On 3 August 1964, the Council moved to a site on the corner of Zhongxiao West Road and Zhongshan South Road, still in Zhongzheng District. The building occupied an area of 42,965 m2. In 2016, the Taipei City Government plans to redevelop the abandoned former council building into the Taipei City Vision Museum as part of the Taipei museum strip. The building was demolished on 25 February 2016 and reopened to the public as open green space on 9 April 2016.

Current building
The current Council building is located in the History Project Area of Taipei in Xinyi District. It was inaugurated on 8 October 1990.

Organization
 Speaker
 Deputy Speaker
 Secretary-General
 Deputy Secretary-General
 Permanent Committee's office
 Secretariat Office
 Procedure Section
 General Affairs Section
 Documents Section
 Public Relations Office
 Legal Affairs Office
 Information Office
 Personnel Office
 Accounting Office
 Permanent Committees
 Civil Affairs Committee
 Finance and Construction Committee
 Education Committee
 Transportation Committee
 Police and Sanitation Committee
 Public Works Committee
 Legislation Committee
 Special Committees
 Procedure Committee
 Discipline Committee

Transportation
The council building is accessible within walking distance South West from Taipei City Hall Station of the Taipei Metro.

See also
 Taipei City Government
 Sister cities of Taipei

References

 
Government agencies established in 1946